Oliver W. Jones (September 3, 1897 – August 6, 1975) was a politician in the state of Florida. He served in the Florida House of Representatives from 1955 to 1960, as a Democrat, representing Taylor County.

References

1897 births
1975 deaths
Democratic Party members of the Florida House of Representatives
People from Perry, Florida
20th-century American politicians